The 2011–12 North Caledonian Football League was won by Halkirk United.

Table

References

2011-12
7